Argentina competed at the 2016 Winter Youth Olympics in Lillehammer, Norway from 12 to 21 February 2016.

Alpine skiing

Boys

Girls

Cross-country skiing

Boys

Figure skating

Singles

Freestyle skiing

Slopestyle

Ice hockey

Luge

Snowboarding

Snowboard cross

Slopestyle

See also
Argentina at the 2016 Summer Olympics

References

2016 in Argentine sport
Nations at the 2016 Winter Youth Olympics
Argentina at the Youth Olympics